Vidyasagar Institute of Health is a college in Rangamati, Midnapore, in Paschim Medinipur district. It offers undergraduate and postgraduate courses in sciences. It is affiliated to  Vidyasagar University.

Courses

Bachelor in Medical Laboratory Technology (BMLT)
Bachelor in Physiotherapy
B.Sc (Hons) in Nutrition
Master of Physiotherapy
M.Sc in Nutrition and Dietetics

See also

References

External links
 http://www.midvih.org.in/

Universities and colleges in Paschim Medinipur district
Colleges affiliated to Vidyasagar University
2002 establishments in West Bengal
Educational institutions established in 2002